Anthophila alpinella is a moth of the family Choreutidae. It is found from the north-eastern United States and southern Canada to British Columbia, the Rocky Mountains, and along the Pacific Coast to Marin County, California.

The forewings are cream with heavy brown dusting. There is more solid brown shading present in antemedial line, the inner edge of the postmedial line and the terminal area. The antemedial line has a sharp outward jut in the middle. The postmedial line is cream, most obvious at the apex and also has a sharp outward jut above the middle and a smaller one just below it. The fringe is white with brown at the anal angle, middle and apex. The hindwings are even brown, but slightly darker towards the outer margin, with a white spot or line near the anal angle and a mostly white fringe. The head and thorax are the same as the ground colour of the forewings. The abdomen is even brown, but paler at the end of each segment.

In Canada, adults have been recorded from early June to early July and in September.

The larvae feed on Urtica species, including Urtica dioica. They form a web at the tip of a leaf of their host plant. Larvae can be found in April, July and August.

References

External links
mothphotographersgroup

Choreutidae